Cerro Walther Penck (also known as Cerro Cazadero or Cerro Tipas) is a massive complex volcano in the Andes, located in northwestern Argentina, Catamarca Province, Tinogasta Department, at the Puna de Atacama. It is just southwest of Ojos del Salado, the highest volcano in the world.  Walther Penck itself is perhaps the third highest active volcano in the world.

Vulcanism
There are reports of fumarolic activity, and de Silva and Francis (1991) considered that the volcano was last active in the Holocene. Crater lakes with a smell of sulfur were reported in 2013. The Tipas-Cerro Bayo complex was active 2.9-1.2 million years ago with dacites and rhyolites. Magma composition is typical for Andean stratovolcanoes. Tomographic studies of the underlying crust indicate a pattern of seismic attenuation beneath Tipas.

Elevation
It has an official height of 6658 meters, however, based on the elevation provided by the available Digital elevation models, SRTM (6663m), ASTER (6627m), SRTM filled with ASTER (6663m), TanDEM-X(6699m), and also a handheld GPS survey by Maximo Kausch on 04/2013 (6688 meters), Walther Penck is about 6670 meters above sea level.

The height of the nearest key col is 6019 meters. so its prominence is 651 meters. Walther Penck is listed as mountain, based on the Dominance system  and its dominance is 9.76%. Its parent peak is Ojos del Salado and the Topographic isolation is 9.8 kilometers. This information was obtained during a research by Suzanne Imber in 2014.

See also
List of volcanoes in Argentina

External links
Elevation information about Walther Penck
Weather Forecast at Walther Penck
Information about Cazadero

References

Mountains of Argentina
Polygenetic volcanoes
Stratovolcanoes of Argentina
Lava domes
Six-thousanders of the Andes
Pleistocene stratovolcanoes